Philosemitism is a notable interest in, respect for, and appreciation of the Jewish people, their history, and the influence of Judaism, particularly on the part of a non-Jew. In the aftermath of World War II, the phenomenon of philosemitism saw a great increase throughout Europe following the Holocaust, reshaping the relationship between Jews and European societies. American historian G. Daniel Cohen states that philosemitism "can indeed easily recycle antisemitic themes, recreate Jewish otherness, or strategically compensate for Holocaust guilt".

Etymology 
The controversial term "philosemitism" arose as a pejorative in Germany to describe the positive prejudice towards Jews; in other words, a philosemite is a "Jew-lover" or "Jew-friend".

Concept
The concept of philosemitism is not new, and it was arguably avowed by such thinkers as the 19th-century philosopher Friedrich Nietzsche, who described himself as an "anti-anti-Semite."

Philosemitism is an expression of the larger phenomenon of allophilia, admiration for foreign cultures as embodied in the more widely known Anglophilia and Francophilia. The rise of philosemitism has also prompted some to reconsider Jewish history, and they argue that while antisemitism must be acknowledged, it is wrong to reduce the history of the Jewish people to one merely of suffering (as has been fostered by well-meaning gentile philosemites).

Czechoslovakia
The case of the myths created around the supposed special relationship between Tomáš Garrigue Masaryk, the founding father of Czechoslovakia, and influential Jews from the U.S. or elsewhere, myths created by Masaryk and adopted in amended forms by Czechoslovak Jews, let cultural historian Martin Wein quote Zygmunt Bauman's and Artur Sandauer's concept of an "allosemitic" worldview, in which, in Wein's words, "antisemitism and philosemitism overlap and share stereotypes, producing exaggerated disregard or admiration for Jews or Judaism." In this sense, Wein quotes Masaryk's statements about a decisive Jewish influence over the press, and him mentioning Jews and freemasons in the same breath, when it came to lobbies he allegedly managed to win over.

Asia
Very few Jews live in East Asian countries, but Jews are viewed in an especially positive light in some of them, partly owing to their shared wartime experiences during the Second World War. Examples include South Korea, Japan, and China. In general, Jews are positively stereotyped as intelligent, business-savvy and committed to family values and responsibility, while in the Western world, the first of the two aforementioned stereotypes more often have the negatively interpreted equivalents of guile and greed. In South Korean primary schools the Talmud is mandatory reading. According to Mary J. Ainslie, philosemitism in China is "part of a civilizationist narrative designed to position China as globally central and superior".

United States
Mark Twain's essay Concerning the Jews has been described as philosemitic. Israeli scholar Bennet Kravitz states that one could just as easily hate Jews for the reasons Twain gives for admiring them. In fact, Twain's essay was cited by Nazi sympathizers in the 1930s. Kravitz concludes, "The flawed logic of 'Concerning the Jews' and all philo-Semitism leads to the anti-Semitic beliefs that the latter seeks to deflate".

See also
 Anglican Friends of Israel
 Anti-antisemitism
 Christian Zionism
 Conversion to Judaism
 Hebrew Roots
 Daniel Deronda
 Ger toshav
 God-Fearers
 Judeo-Christian
 Ruth (biblical figure)

References

Sources
 Alan Edelstein. An Unacknowledged Harmony: Philo-Semitism and the Survival of European Jewry. (Contributions in Ethnic Studies).  
 David S. Katz. Philo-Semitism and the Readmission of the Jews to England, 1603–1655. 
 Hilary L. Rubinstein & William D. Rubinstein.  Philosemitism: Admiration and Support in the English-Speaking World for Jews, 1840–1939. (Studies in Modern History). 
 Frank Stern. The Whitewashing of the Yellow Badge: Antisemitism and Philosemitism in Postwar Germany. (Studies in Antisemitism) 
 Marion Mushkat. Philo-Semitic and Anti-Jewish Attitudes in Post-Holocaust Poland. (Symposium Series, Vol 33). 
 Frank Stern. Im Anfang war Auschwitz : Antisemitismus und Philosemitismus im deutschen Nachkrieg. 
 Gertrude Himmelfarb. The People of the Book: Philosemitism in England, From Cromwell to Churchill.

Further reading

External links
 Washington Post, January 8, 2006; page A01.
 "On Philo-Semitism", by Jacques Berlinerblau, Georgetown University's Program for Jewish Civilization via archive.org.

Jewish political status
Admiration of foreign cultures
Orientalism by type